Temple Neuf (meaning "New Temple") is a Protestant church in Metz, France. It is located on place de la Comédie (next to Opéra-Théâtre), at the center of the Jardin d'Amour on the southwestern edge of Île du Petit-Saulcy, which is surrounded by the Moselle.

The church was built by Glod, with the first stone being laid on 25 November 1901 (when Metz was a part of the German Empire), following plans by architect Conrad Wahn. It was inaugurated as the Neue evangelische Kirche on 14 May 1904 in the presence of Wilhelm II, German Emperor, and his wife Augusta Victoria of Schleswig-Holstein. The church is an example of Romanesque Revival architecture, and has been a monument historique of France since 1930.

References

External links

 Le Temple Neuf 
 Paroisse de Metz – Temple Neuf 

Buildings and structures in Metz
Metz TempleNeuf
Metz TempleNeuf
Metz TempleNeuf
Metz TempleNeuf